, also known as Patlabor (a portmanteau of "patrol" and "labor"), is a Japanese science fiction media franchise created by Headgear, a group consisting of manga artist Masami Yūki, director Mamoru Oshii, screenwriter Kazunori Itō, mecha designer Yutaka Izubuchi, and character designer Akemi Takada.

The popular franchise includes a manga, a TV series, two OVA series, three feature-length movies, two light novel series, and a short film compilation, named  because of its super deformed (chibi) drawing style. The series has been adapted into video games and licensed products from OST to toys. Patlabor is known for using mecha – designed by Yutaka Izubuchi – not just for police or military purposes, but also for industrial and municipal jobs. The series is one of the earlier examples of what is called a "media mix" in Japan, where there is no one source material: Multiple forms of media (in Patlabor's case the anime and manga) are worked on at the same time independently of each other.

Animations from Patlabor were used extensively in the music video "Juke Joint Jezebel" by KMFDM. The manga received the 36th Shogakukan Manga Award for shōnen in 1991.

Plot

The story takes place in what was, at the time of release, the near future of 1998–2002. Robots called "Labors" are employed in heavy construction work. The Tokyo Metropolitan Police has its own fleet of Patrol Labors ("Patlabors"; as opposed to patrol cars) to combat crimes/terrorism and deal with accidents involving Labors. The story arcs usually revolve around Tokyo Metropolitan Police Special Vehicle Section 2, Division 2. Noa Izumi is the main protagonist of the series, but all of Division 2 play roles. Hata and Kusumi are main protagonists of the third Patlabor film. The Next Generation takes place in 2013, with an entirely new cast with the exception of Shige and Buchiyama in maintenance, but the new members of SV2 have similar names and personalities to the old ones.

The feature films follow a separate continuity, referred to as the "movie timeline", as opposed to the "TV timeline", with the Early Days OVA following the "movie timeline", and the New Files OVA following the "TV timeline". In addition, the manga follows its own continuity.

The Next Generation features episodes that directly reference the TV series, while its final episode and movie are a direct sequel to the second movie.

Media

Manga
Released by Shogakukan through Shonen Sunday magazine from 1988 to 1994, the 22-volume series takes place in a separate timeline.

Japanese volumes
Original release:
 , July 1988 
 , September 1988
 , December 1988
 , July 1989
 , December 1989
 , March 1990
 , June 1990
 , September 1990
 , January 1991
 , April 1991
 , July 1991
 , October 1991
 , December 1991
 , March 1992
 , May 1992
 , October 1992
 , April 1993
 , June 1993
 , September 1993
 , December 1993
 , March 1994
 , August 1994

Bunkoban release:
 , January 2000
 , January 2000
 , March 2000
 , March 2000
 , May 2000
 , May 2000
 , July 2000
 , July 2000
 , September 2000
 , September 2000
 , November 2000

North America volumes
Viz released first two volumes of the manga as individual comics in 1997 and 1998, then released them as volumes:
 , 1998
 , 1998

Anime

The Early Days OVA
Mobile Police Patlabor (1988–1989, OVA, 7 episodes)
Also referred to as The Early Days. Details the origins of the Tokyo MPD's 2nd Special Vehicles Section, otherwise known as SV2.

Movies
Patlabor: The Movie (1989)
A series of random labor incidents across the Greater Tokyo Area puts the SV2 on the case. The incidents turn out to be part of a dead programmer's diabolical plot to create a much bigger rampage.

Patlabor 2: The Movie (1993)
A secret group of terrorists engineer a crisis in Tokyo in the winter of 2001–2002. The members of SV2's Section 2, who have been reassigned to other duties since the events of WXIII, reunite one more time to stop the threat.

WXIII: Patlabor the Movie 3 (2002)
Taking place a year after Patlabor: The Movie, the film features two MPD detectives who investigate the case of missing scientists working on a genetic engineering project that runs amuck in Tokyo Bay. SV2's Section 2 is later called in to help rein in the danger.

TV series and OVA sequel
Patlabor: The TV Series (1989–1990, TV, 47 episodes)
Taking place in a different continuity, the series features more adventures of SV2 Section 2, which includes an arc involving their efforts to combat an advanced Schaft Enterprises Labor called the Type J9 Griffon.

Patlabor: The New Files (1990–1992, OVA, 16 episodes)
Also referred to as Patlabor 2, the series contains episodes that took place at several points between certain episodes in the TV series and after the latter's final episode. The OVA also features the conclusion of the Griffon storyarc.

A three-part series of short films known as "Mobile Police Patlabor Minimum: Minipato" were shown before screenings of WXIII in 2002, Minipato uses paper puppets, CGI, and claymation to explain the rationale behind the whole concept of the series, especially how the Labors functioned in a realistic hard science fiction setting.

Patlabor REBOOT
Kidō Keisatsu Patlabor REBOOT was a short animated film released as part of Japan Animator Expo 2016 featuring a modernised version of Patlabor with new characters and utilising CG for the Labors. On November 24, 2016 it was announced that a new Patlabor project has started.

Live-action series

At the 2013 Tokyo Anime Fair, Tohokushinsha Film Corporation announced a live-action Patlabor project to be launched in 2014. On July 4, 2013, Mamoru Oshii announced that he would be involved in the project, in an unspecified capacity.

On September 25, 2013, it was announced that Japanese actors Erina Mano would star as pilot Akira Izumino, Seiji Fukushi as Yūma Shiobara, Rina Oota as Ekaterina Krachevna Kankaeva ("Kasha"), Shigeru Chiba reprising his anime role as chief Shigeo Shiba and Toshio Kakei as Captain Keiji Gotōda.

Called The Next Generation -Patlabor-, the project consisted of a drama series and movie. The drama series is divided into 14 "short story" episodes released to blu-ray and DVD and exclusively aired on BS Digital and Star Channel airing from 2014 and 2015, with limited advanced theatrical screenings dividing the series into 7 "chapters", each comprising two episodes. The movie  released in theatres on 1 May 2015, and a director's cut version of the movie was released on 10 October 2015.

The Next Generation takes place in the Patlabor world's version of 2013 Tokyo, and is a sequel to the TV series, the OVA series and the second movie. The completion of the Babylon Project led to disuse of Labors, and Japan is in the midst of a recession. Labors falling into disuse also means there is also no place for the patrol labor squads, which have been shrunk to only one division.

The drama series follows the new members of SV2 as they solve cases and get into trouble like their predecessors did.

In the movie, followers of Yukihito Tsuge carry out terrorist attacks on Tokyo, re-enacting Tsuge's coup, and SV2 has to stop them.

Patlabor EZY
A new project announced at Annecy International Animated Film Festival in 2017. A pilot is reported to debut in August 2022.

Novels

Patlabor 1-5
Novels taking place in the same universe as the Early Days OVA and first movie.
 Kidō Keisatsu Patlabor: Fuusoku 40 Meter (Kazunori Ito) – October 1990
 Kidō Keisatsu Patlabor 2: Syntax Error (Michiko Yokote) – March 1992
 Kidō Keisatsu Patlabor 3: Third Mission (Michiko Yokote) – September 1992
 Kidō Keisatsu Patlabor 4: Blackjack (Zenpen) (Michiko Yokote) – July 1993
 Kidō Keisatsu Patlabor 5: Blackjack (Kouhen) (Michiko Yokote) – October 1993

TOKYO WAR
 TOKYO WAR: Kidō Keisatsu Patlabor (Zenpen) (Mamoru Oshii) – April 1994
 TOKYO WAR: Kidō Keisatsu Patlabor (Kouhen) (Mamoru Oshii) – May 1994
Novelization of the second movie.
 TOKYO WAR MOBILE POLICE PATLABOR (Mamoru Oshii) – June 2005 
A hardcover edition combining the two older volumes.

The Next Generation
Novels taking place in the world of The Next Generation.
 THE NEXT GENERATION Patlabor 1: Yuuma no Yuuutsu (Kei Yamamura) – March 2014
 THE NEXT GENERATION Patlabor 2: Akira no Ashita (Kei Yamamura) – April 2014
 THE NEXT GENERATION Patlabor 3: Shiroi Kasha (Kei Yamamura) – June 2014
 THE NEXT GENERATION Patlabor: Akai Kasha (Kei Yamamura) – February 2015
The fourth novel by Yamamura is not numbered.
 THE NEXT GENERATION Patlabor: TOKYO WAR 2 Haiiro no Yuurei (Mamoru Oshii and Kei Yamamura) – May 2015
Novelization of the live action movie Shuto Kessen, which is also a sequel to the TOKYO WAR novels.

Other
 Bankuruwase: Keishi-chou Keibi-bu Tokushu Sharyou Ni-ka (Mamoru Oshii) - January 2011
A sequel to Patlabor taking place in the present day with a new generation of SV2 members, later used as inspiration for The Next Generation.
 Kouseki no Otoko (Mamoru Oshii) - 2015
Not a novel but short story included in the anthology Tag: Watashi no Aibou (2015) taking place in the Patlabor world.

Video games
All Patlabor video games were released exclusively in Japan.

Patlabor games
 Kidō Keisatsu Patlabor (Family Computer Disk System – January 24, 1989)
 Kidō Keisatsu Patlabor (Game Boy – August 25, 1990)
 Kidō Keisatsu Patlabor: 98-Shiki Kidou Seyo! (Mega Drive – October 23, 1992)
 Kidō Keisatsu Patlabor: Griffon-hen (PC Engine Super CD-ROM² – September 30, 1993)
 Kidō Keisatsu Patlabor (Super Famicom – April 22, 1994)
 Kidō Keisatsu Patlabor: Game Edition (PlayStation – November 30, 2000)
 Patlabor: Come Back Mini-Pato (PlayStation Portable – November 2, 2005)

Appearances
 Super Robot Wars Operation Extend (PlayStation Portable – July 18, 2013)
 Kyoei Toshi (PlayStation 4 – October 19, 2017)

Licensing
All of the main Patlabor anime productions have been released overseas in some form. All the movies have been translated into English and are available in Region 1, 2 & 4 DVD format. Most of the manga is not available in North America in English, and the video games, novels and live action series have also not been released outside of Japan.

The TV series and OVAs were released in the U.S. by Central Park Media. The first two movies were released by Manga Entertainment, but later remastered and re-released in 2006 by Bandai Visual. The third movie (along with "Mini-Pato") was released by Geneon Entertainment (formerly Pioneer). Twelve sections of the manga have been translated and published by Viz Communications as single issues and in two trade paperbacks, but later dropped the manga before completing it.

Mini-Pato is available on DVD in regions 1, 2, and 4 in the Limited Edition Patlabor WXIII DVD packages.

In 2006, Bandai Visual's Honneamise label re-released the first two movies on DVD in North America with extensive bonus features and an alternate English track, and Beez Entertainment handled distribution in the UK.

Madman has the distribution rights for the movies in Australia and New Zealand in association with Manga Entertainment UK & TFC, Madman have been refused the rights to the Bandai Visual dubs of the Movies. In 2011 Madman Entertainment announced that they had secured the rights to the Early Days OVA series and the TV series from TFC, but announced on the 13th of April 2012 that due to unforeseen circumstances, Madman had indefinitely delayed their release into Australia and did not elaborate on the reasons. However, Madman has since rescheduled the first OVA for DVD and Blu-ray release on June 19, 2013. In July 2013, MVM Films has licensed the first OVA & TV series for distribution in the UK and will release them on Blu-ray and DVD.

In 2013, Maiden Japan (in conjunction with Section23 Films) acquired the licence to the Patlabor OAV series, and released it on Blu-ray and DVD on April 30, 2013. They subsequently licensed and released the TV series on July 16, 2013; the second OVA series on February 17, 2015; and all of the films, with the first film released on May 5, 2015.

Headgear
 is a group consisting of five main writers and artists who work in the Japanese anime/manga field.  The group was set up so that all the creators could retain full copyright to their work, achieve greater publicity for their work and sell their manga to anime sponsors for film production. The members are Masami Yuki, Yutaka Izubuchi, Kazunori Itō, Akemi Takada, and Mamoru Oshii. Together they worked on the anime series Patlabor and the two episode OVA Twilight Q.

Other staff involved with Headgear include Kenji Kawai, Naoyuki Yoshinaga, Takayama Fumihiko, Kenji Kamiyama, and Miki Tori.

Reception and legacy

The manga received the 36th Shogakukan Manga Award for shōnen in 1991. Guillermo del Toro has cited the series as an influence for Pacific Rim. In 2018, the Japan Anniversary Association recognized August 10 as "Patlabor Day".

References

External links

 "Untranslated Pick of the Month"—J-pop.com review of manga
 
 

 
1988 anime OVAs
1988 manga
1990 Japanese novels
1994 Japanese novels
2002 anime films
Action anime and manga
Bandai Visual
Central Park Media
Comedy anime and manga
Eco-terrorism in fiction
Fujimi Fantasia Bunko
IG Port franchises
Light novels
Madhouse (company)
Maiden Japan
Police in anime and manga
Production I.G
Science fiction anime and manga
Shogakukan manga
Shōnen manga
Studio Deen
Tokyo Metropolitan Police Department in fiction
Viz Media manga
Winners of the Shogakukan Manga Award for shōnen manga